was a railway station on the Kaikyo Line in Shiriuchi, Hokkaido, Japan, operated by Hokkaido Railway Company (JR Hokkaido). Opened in 1990, it closed in March 2014. The undersea Seikan Tunnel to the main Japanese island of Honshu is not far from this station.

Lines
Shiriuchi Station was served by the Kaikyo Line, which connects Honshu with the northern island of Hokkaido via the Seikan Tunnel. Only Hakuchō and Super Hakuchō limited express services stopped at this station, with just two trains in each direction stopping daily in 2013.

Station layout
The station had two side platforms serving two tracks. The platforms were connected to the station entrance by a footbridge.

Platforms

History
Shiriuchi Station opened in 1990. The station was closed from the start of the 15 March 2014 timetable revision to make way for Hokkaido Shinkansen construction work. Following the closure of the station, the signal located there was renamed .

Surrounding area
 National Route 228

References

Railway stations in Japan opened in 1990
Stations of Hokkaido Railway Company
Railway stations in Hokkaido Prefecture
Tsugaru-Kaikyō Line
Railway stations in Japan opened in 1988
Railway stations closed in 2014
2014 disestablishments in Japan
Defunct railway stations in Japan